Steven Vertovec (born 2 July 1957) is an anthropologist and Director of the Max Planck Institute for the Study of Religious and Ethnic Diversity, based in Göttingen, Germany. He is also currently Honorary Joint Professor of Sociology and Ethnology at the Georg August University of Göttingen and Supernumerary Fellow at Linacre College, Oxford.

Career 
Born in Chicago, Vertovec completed a double major (anthropology and religious studies) B.A. Magna cum laude at the University of Colorado, Boulder in 1979. Thereafter, he gained an M.A. in Religious Studies at the University of California, Santa Barbara in 1982. In 1988 he was awarded a D.Phil. in Social Anthropology at the University of Oxford, where he was a student at Nuffield College.

Vertovec’s doctoral work concerned religion, ethnicity and socio-economic development in Trinidad, West Indies. Since then, his work has examined issues surrounding ethnic and religious minorities, international migration, multiculturalism, cosmopolitanism, diasporas, transnationalism, diversity and super-diversity. He has mainly conducted research in Britain and Germany.

He has been awarded a scholarship from Nuffield College, Oxford and fellowships from the University of California, Alexander von Humboldt Foundation, British Economic and Social Research Council and the  Wissenschaftskolleg (Institute for Advanced Study), Berlin. Recent grants include an Advanced Investigator Award from the European Research Council
 
Vertovec has held numerous positions, including: Postdoctoral Fellow (under an award from the Leverhulme Trust) in the School of Geography at the University of Oxford; Principal Research Fellow at the ESRC Centre for Research on Ethnic Relations, University of Warwick; Professor of Transnational Anthropology at the Institute of Social and Cultural Anthropology, University of Oxford; and Senior Research Fellow at Linacre College, Oxford.
 
He has managed several large-scale research initiatives, including: Director of ‘Multicultural Policies and Modes of Citizenship in European Cities’ within UNESCO’s MOST programme; Director of the ESRC national research programme on ‘Transnational Communities’; and Founding Director of the ESRC Centre on Migration, Policy and Society (COMPAS). Vertovec has acted as expert or consultant for numerous agencies, including the Expert Council of German Foundations on Migration and Integration, the UK government’s Cabinet Office, National Audit Office, Home Office, Department for International Development, Department of Communities and Local Government, the British Council, the European Commission, the G8, World Bank and UNESCO.

After coining the term super-diversity different major news outlets have reported on Vertovec's research   and Vertovec himself has actively contributed to debates on immigration and thinking about social complexities

Selected publications 
 Clarke, Colin, Ceri Peach and Steven Vertovec, eds. [1990] South Asians Overseas: Migration and Ethnicity, Cambridge: Cambridge University Press, .
 Rogers, Alisdair and Steven Vertovec, eds [1995] The Urban Context: Ethnicity, Social Networks, and Situational Analysis, Oxford: Berg .
 Vertovec S.  [1992] Hindu Trinidad: Religion, Ethnicity and Socio-Economic Change, Basingstoke: Macmillan .
 Vertovec, Steven, Ed. [1999] Migration and Social Cohesion, Aldershot: Edward Elgar .
 Vertovec, Steven [1996] ‘Multiculturalism, culturalism, and public incorporation,’ Ethnic and Racial Studies 19(1): 49-69 .
 Vertovec, Steven and Robin Cohen, eds [1999] Migration, Diasporas and Transnationalism, Aldershot: Edward Elgar .
 Vertovec, Steven [1999] ‘Conceiving and researching transnationalism,’ Ethnic and Racial Studies 22 (2): 447-62 .
 Vertovec, Steven [1999] ‘Minority associations, networks and public policies: re-assessing relationships,’ Journal of Ethnic and Migration Studies 25(1): 21-42 .
 Vertovec, Steven [2000] The Hindu Diaspora: Comparative Patterns, London and New York: Routledge . 
 Vertovec, Steven [2001] ‘Transnationalism and identity,’ Journal of Ethnic and Migration Studies 27(4): 573-82 .
 Vertovec, Steven and Robin Cohen, eds [2002] Conceiving Cosmopolitanism: Theory, Context and Practice, Oxford: Oxford University Press .
 Vertovec, Steven [ 2003] ‘Migration and other forms of transnationalism: Towards conceptual cross-fertilization,’ International Migration Review 37(3): 641-65 .
 Vertovec, Steven [2004] ‘Cheap calls: The social glue of migrant transnationalism,’ Global Networks 4(2) 219-24 .
 Vertovec, Steven [2004] ‘Migrant transnationalism and modes of transformation,’ International Migration Review 38(3): 970-1001 .
 Vertovec, Steven [2007] ‘Super-diversity and its implications’, Ethnic and Racial Studies 29(6): 1024-54: .
 Vertovec, Steven [2009] Transnationalism, London & New York: Routledge: . 
 Vertovec, Steven, Ed. [2009] Anthropology of Migration and Multiculturalism: New Directions, London: Routledge . 
 Vertovec, Steven and Susanne Wessendorf, eds [2010] The Multicultural Backlash: European Discourses, Policies and Practices, London Routledge .
 Vertovec, Steven [2010] ‘Toward post-multiculturalism? Changing communities, conditions and contexts of diversity,’ International Social Science Journal 199: 83-95 .
 Vertovec, Steven, Ed. [2014] Migration and Diversity, Cheltanham: Edward Elgar: . 
 Nowicka, Magda and Steven Vertovec [2014] ‘Introduction: Dreams and realities of living with difference,’ European Journal of Cultural Studies 17(4): 341-356 .
 Vertovec, Steven, Ed. [2015] Routledge International Handbook of Diversity Studies, London and New York: Routledge .
 Meissner, Fran and Steven Vertovec [2015] ‘Comparing super-diversity,’ Ethnic and Racial Studies 38(4): 541-55 .
 Vertovec, Steven, Ed.  [2015] Diversities Old and New: Migration and Socio-spatial Patterns in New York, Singapore and Johannesburg, Basingstoke: Palgrave Macmillan .
 Vertovec, Steven [2017] ‘Mooring, migration milieus and complex explanation’, Ethnic and Racial Studies 40(9): 574-1581

References

External links 
Max Planck Institute for the Study of Religious and Ethnic Diversity (http://www.mmg.mpg.de)
Max Planck Society (http://www.mpg.de)

American anthropologists
Multiculturalism in Europe
Max Planck Institute directors
1957 births
Living people
University of Colorado Boulder alumni
University of California, Santa Barbara alumni
Alumni of Nuffield College, Oxford
Academics of the University of Oxford
People from Chicago
Social anthropologists